Presidential elections were held in Togo on 21 December 1986. The country was a one-party state at the time, with the Rally of the Togolese People as the sole legal party. Its leader, incumbent President Gnassingbé Eyadéma, was the only candidate and was re-elected unopposed. Voter turnout was reported to be 99%.

Results

References

Togo
President
Presidential elections in Togo
Single-candidate elections
One-party elections
Togo